The Ingersoll Schoolhouse is located on U.S. Route 212 east of Belle Fourche, South Dakota and was built in 1890 at a time when one room schoolhouses were very common in South Dakota. It remained in use as a school through 1971.

Due to highway development, the schoolhouse was selected for preservation by Preserve South Dakota in 2012 under their Places in Peril initiative.

References

Schools in Butte County, South Dakota
Defunct schools in South Dakota
Educational institutions established in 1890
Educational institutions disestablished in 1971